The Blue Rock Dam is a minor rock-fill embankment dam with controlled chute spillway across the Tanjil River, located approximately  north of Moe, in the Central Gippsland region of Victoria, Australia. The dam is operated by Southern Rural Water.

Features and location
The dam was built to provide cooling water for the thermal power stations of the Latrobe Valley and to augment domestic water supplies. 

The Blue Rock Lake has two recreation areas on its shore and small power boats are allowed to be used.

In 1992 Pacific Energy installed a small  hydroelectric generator that is linked to the national grid.

Jaidyn Leskie

Jaidyn Leskie was a one-year-old boy who disappeared from his babysitter's house in Moe on 15 June 1997. A large scale search for the boy in the hope of finding him still alive was unsuccessful. His body had been preserved by the cold waters of the lake through winter. The clothing he was wearing was subject to a DNA test in an effort to solve the crime. His murder remains unsolved.

Gallery

References

External links

Dams in Victoria (Australia)
West Gippsland catchment
Rivers of Gippsland (region)
Dams completed in 1984
Embankment dams